Atelopus lozanoi is a species of toads in the family Bufonidae.

It is endemic to Colombia.
Its natural habitats are subtropical or tropical high-altitude grassland and rivers.
It is threatened by habitat loss.

References

lozanoi
Amphibians of Colombia
Amphibians of the Andes
Amphibians described in 2001
Taxonomy articles created by Polbot